This is a list of dishes found in Ireland. Irish cuisine is a style of cooking originating from Ireland, developed or adapted by Irish people. It evolved from centuries of social and political change, and in the 20th and 21st century has more international influences. The cuisine takes its influence from the crops grown and animals farmed in its temperate climate. The introduction of the potato in the second half of the 16th century heavily influenced Ireland's cuisine thereafter and, as a result, is often closely associated with Ireland. Representative Irish dishes include Irish stew, bacon and cabbage, boxty, coddle, and colcannon.

Irish dishes

See also

 List of Republic of Ireland food and drink products with protected status
 List of restaurant chains in Ireland
 Pork in Ireland

References

Lists of foods by nationality
Dishes